Phyllonorycter mwatawalai is a moth   of the family Gracillariidae. It is found in the Morogoro area of Tanzania. The habitat consists of a degraded savannah-like, natural biotope rich in low-growing woody Acacia trees and bushes and thick low dry herbarious vegetation. The area was surrounded by cultivated agricultural areas (orchards and maize fields).

The length of the forewings is 1.7 mm. The forewing is elongate and the ground colour is ochreous with a golden lustre and with white markings. The hindwings are pale grey with a silver shine. Adults are on wing from mid-May to mid-July.

Etymology
The species is named in honour of Professor Maulid Walad Mwatawala, An entomologist and Professor in the Department of Crop Science and Production at the Sokoine University of Agriculture in Tanzania.

References

Endemic fauna of Tanzania
Moths described in 2012
mwatawalai
Insects of Tanzania
Moths of Africa

Taxa named by Jurate de Prins